NH 101 may refer to:

 National Highway 101 (India)
 New Hampshire Route 101, United States